Asi Rahamim (born 3 July 1971) is an Israeli former professional footballer that has played in Hapoel Be'er Sheva.

Honours

Club
 Hapoel Be'er Sheva

 Premier League:
 Third place (3): 1993/1994, 1994/1995, 1996/1997
 State Cup:
 Runners-up (1): 2002/2003
 Toto Cup:
 Winners (1): 1995/1996
 Toto Cup Second League:
 Winners (1): 2008/2009
 Runners-up (1): 2005/2006

References

External links
 
 

1971 births
Living people
Israeli footballers
Association football goalkeepers
Hapoel Be'er Sheva F.C. players
Hapoel Ashkelon F.C. players
Maccabi Yavne F.C. players
F.C. Ashdod players
Liga Leumit players
Israeli Premier League players
Footballers from Beersheba
Israeli people of Iraqi-Jewish descent
Israeli people of Moroccan-Jewish descent